This is a timeline of the history of darts on television in the UK.

1970s
 1972
 Ten years after darts first appeared on British television when Westward Television broadcast the Westward TV Invitational to the south-west of England, ITV shows darts on a national basis for the first time when it shows coverage of that year's News of the World Darts Championship as part of its World of Sport programme.

 1973
 5 April – The Indoor League is shown nationally for the first time on ITV for the first time. The programme, which focuses on various games played indoors, includes a darts tournament for both men and women and the programme is later recognised as the 'birthplace of television darts'.

 1974
 31 August – ITV shows the first edition of the World Masters. It continues to show the event until it drops darts in 1988.
 The BBC shows darts for the first time when it covers that year's British Open.

 1975
 No events.

 1976
 No events.

 1977
 Anglia Television broadcasts the first edition of the Butlins Grand Masters. Anglia continues to show the event until 1986.

 1978
 6–10 February – The BBC broadcasts highlights of the inaugural BDO World Darts Championship.
 7 April – The Indoor League is shown for the final time, ending after six series.
 The BBC shows the first edition of the BDO Gold Cup.

 1979
 No events.

1980s 
 1980
 No events.

 1981
 The BBC further expands its coverage of darts when it shows the first edition of the British Professional Championship. It shows the event until it decides to cut back its coverage of darts in 1988.

 1982
 The BBC shows the first edition of the BDO Gold Cup for the final time.

 1983
 No events.

 1984
 Butlins Grand Masters and the British Matchplay lose most of their television coverage.

 1985
 No events.

 1986
 No events.

 1987
 No events.

 1988
 Summer – The BBC announces that it will end all coverage of darts apart from the World Championships.
 October – ITV announces that it will stop showing darts and that the final event that it will show will be the forthcoming World Masters.

 1989
 6-14 January – Following both the BBC and ITV deciding to stop showing darts, the only darts seen on television in 1989 is the 1989 BDO World Darts Championship.

1990s 
 1990
 Even though once again, only one tournament is broadcast on terrestrial television, some darts coverage, including the World Masters, is broadcast on British Satellite Broadcasting’s Sports Channel.

 1991
 Sky Sports broadcasts the World Masters, and does so again in 1992.

 1992
 Sky signs a deal with the newly formed World Darts Council, later renamed the Professional Darts Corporation (PDC), to broadcast three of its tournaments.

 1993
 Following the Split in darts, Sky stops covering BDO tournaments.
 Cable channel Wire TV broadcasts the World Masters darts tournament.  It also shows the 1994 event.
 26 December – Sky Sports covers the first PDC World Darts Championship and has broadcast the event every year since that initial tournament.

 1994
 Wire TV broadcasts the 1994 BDO Gold Cup. It also shows the 1995 event.
 1–8 August – Sky Sports broadcasts the first World Matchplay. Sky continues to show this event to this day.

 1995
 L!VE TV shows coverage of that year's World Masters. ITV shows brief highlights in its night-time programme Sport AM.

 1996
 Eurosport takes over as broadcaster of the World Masters.

 1997
 No events.

 1998
 14–18 October – Sky Sports shows the first edition of the World Grand Prix. It continues to show this event to this day.

 1999
 ITV broadcasts a one-off event between the 1999 BDO v PDC showdown between Phil Taylor and Raymond van Barneveld.

2000s 
 2000
 No events.

 2001
 The BBC replaces Eurosport as broadcaster of the World Masters. This is the first time in many years that the BBC has broadcast a darts event other than the BDO World Darts Championship. The BBC shows the event until 2010.

 2002
 4–7 July – Sky Sports shows the first edition of a new overseas tournament, the Las Vegas Desert Classic. Sky continues to show the event until it ends in 2009.

 2003
 30 May-3 June – Sky Sports shows the first edition of the UK Open and continues to show the event until 2013.

 2004
 21 November – Sky Sports broadcasts a pay-per-view challenge match between Phil Taylor, the reigning PDC world champion, and incumbent BDO World Champion Andy Fordham.

2005
 1 January – The start of the 2005 BDO World Darts Championship sees the BBC provide live coverage of every dart live for the first time when the BBC introduced interactive coverage on its BBC Red Button service.
 20 January – Sky Sports shows the first night of a new tournament Premier League Darts. The League is a new format and is played over a number of one-off nights, generally every Thursday. Sky continues to show the event to this day.

 2006
 No events.

 2007
 17–25 November – Having not shown live darts since 1988, ITV resumes live coverage of the sport when it shows the inaugural Grand Slam of Darts. It shows some of the event on the main ITV channel with the rest of the coverage shown on ITV4. ITV goes on to broadcast the event until 2010.

 2008
 Setanta Sports broadcasts the 2008 BDO Gold Cup.
 30 October-2 November – Following the successful broadcasting of the Grand Slam of Darts, ITV starts showing a new tournament, the European Championship.

 2009
 No events.

2010s
2010
 29 July-1 August –  Bravo shows darts for the first and only time when it broadcasts the 2010 European Championship.

2011
 6 July – ESPN announces a deal with the British Darts Organisation which sees it become exclusive broadcaster of the World Masters along with other BDO tournaments. The deal also includes shared coverage with the BBC of the BDO World Darts Championship.
 September – Having lost the contract to show the Grand Slam of Darts to Sky Sports, ITV picks up the rights to the European Darts Championship and the Second Players Championship Finals of 2011.

2012
 7 January – ESPN breaks the BBC’s monopoly on covering the BDO World Darts Championship. This begins a pattern which continues with BT Sport from 2014 whereby two broadcasters share the rights with ESPN (and from 2015 BT Sport) showing the weeknight evening coverage exclusively live with all other coverage shared between both broadcasters.
 20–23 September – ESPN shows the 2012 Darts European Championship, thereby becoming the first broadcaster in Britain to show both BDO and PDC tournaments at the same time.

2013
 14 June – The PDC and ITV announce a new deal to cover four tournaments a year from 2013 to 2015. The tournaments are The Players Championship which they had covered from 2009 to 2010 and from December 2011 – present, The European Championship which they covered previously in 2008 and 2011, a new tournament called the Masters and the UK Open. A fifth tournament is added to ITV's contract the following year, for the World Series of Darts Finals.
 December – Sky Sports Darts appears for the first time to broadcast 24/7 coverage of the PDC World Darts Championship.

2014
 4–9 February – Eurosport shows the first edition of the BDO World Trophy. It also shows the 2015 event.  
 7–9 March – ITV takes over as broadcaster of the UK Open.
 November – ITV signs a deal to cover five darts tournaments in 2015 covering a new tournament entitled the World Series of Darts Finals. This means that in 2015 ITV will cover the Masters in January, the UK Open in March, the European Championship in October, the World Series of Darts Finals and Players Championship Finals in November.
 18 December – For the first time, Sky Sports broadcasts a full time temporary channel Sky Sports Darts for the duration of the PDC World Darts Championship. The channel mixes live coverage with replays of the most recent sessions and classic moments from the tournament's history. Sky Sports Darts has returned in all subsequent years.

2015
 January – BT Sport becomes the secondary rights holder to the BDO World Darts Championship.

2016
 2–10 January – The BBC shows the BDO World Darts Championship for the final time.
 February – It is announced that the BBC will cover the inaugural PDC Champions League of Darts. As a consequence the BBC would no longer show the BDO World Darts Championships, a tournament that the BBC had shown since its inception in 1978. This is the first time that the BBC has covered a PDC event.
 28–30 May – UKTV channel Dave makes a one-off return to darts when it shows the 2016 BDO World Trophy.
 1–4 December – Premier Sports broadcasts the 2016 World Masters. It does so just once as the tournament returns to Eurosport the following year.

2017
 7 January – Channel 4 broadcasts darts for the first time when it shows live coverage of the 2017 BDO World Darts Championship. Channel 4 also shows the 2018 event.
 26–29 May – The 2017 BDO World Trophy is broadcast by short-lived sports channel Front Runner. The channel also shows the England Open the following month.

2018
 30 May-3 June – Premier Sports broadcasts full coverage of the 2018 BDO World Trophy.

2019
 January – Eurosport is the exclusive broadcaster of the 2019 BDO World Darts Championship. It shows some of the games on sister free-to-air channel QUEST. Eurosport also shows that year’s World Masters and BDO World Trophy. Eurosport also shows the 2020 event.

2020s
 2020
 No events.

 2021
 No events.

 2022
 3–6 February – The BBC and BT Sport broadcast full live coverage of the first World Seniors Darts Championship.
 2–10 April – Eurosport is the exclusive broadcaster of the World Darts Federation's World Championships.

 2023
 February – Viaplay Sports becomes the rights holder of the PDC European Tour of 13 live events for the next five seasons.

References

darts on UK television
darts on UK television
darts on UK television
Sports television in the United Kingdom
darts on UK television
Darts in the United Kingdom